Eileen Norah Owbridge (née Murphy; 8 September 1903 – 4 February 1994) was a British writer who under the pseudonym Jane Arbor wrote 57 romances for Mills & Boon from 1948 to 1985.

She wrote doctor-nurse and foreign romances. Many of her doctor-nurse romances have been re-edited with different titles, that included medical words. She lived in Preston, Sussex, England.

Bibliography

As Jane Arbor

Single novels
This Second Spring, (1948)
Each Song Twice Over, (1948)
Ladder of Understanding, (1949)
Strange Loyalties = Doctor's Love, (1949)
By Yet Another Door = Nurse in Waiting, (1950)
No Lease for Love = My Surgeon Neighbor, (1950)
The Heart Expects Adventure, (1951)
Memory Serves My Love, (1952)
The Eternal Circle = Nurse Atholl Returns, (1952)
Flower of the Nettle = Consulting Surgeon, (1953)
Such Frail Armour = Nurse in Love, (1953)
Folly of the Heart = Nurse Harlowe, (1954)
Jess Mawney, Queen's Nurse = Queen's Nurse, (1954)
Dear Intruder, (1955)
City Nurse = Nurse Greve, (1956)
Towards the Dawn, (1956)
Yesterday's Magic, (1957)
Far Sanctuary, (1958)
No Silver Spoon, (1959)
Sandflower, (1959)
A Girl Named Smith, (1960)
Nurse of All Work, (1962)
Desert Nurse, (1963)
Jasmine Harvest, (1963)
Lake of Shadows, (1964)
Kingfisher Tide, (1965)
High Master of Clere, (1966)
Summer Every Day, (1966)
Golden Apple Island, (1967)
Stranger's Trespass, (1968)
The Cypress Garden, 1969/May)
Walk into the Wind, (1970/Jan)
The Feathered Shaft, (1970/May)
The Linden Leaf, (1971)
The Other Miss Donne, (1971/Aug)
Wildfire Quest, (1972/Jan)
The Flower on the Rock, (1972/Nov)
Roman Summer, (1973/Jul)
The Velvet Spur, (1974/Mar)
Meet the Sun Halfway, (1974/Aug)
The Wide Fields of Home, (1975/Mar)
Smoke into Flame, (1975/Nov)
Tree of Paradise, (1976/Aug)
Two Pins in a Fountain, (1977/Jan)
A Growing Moon, (1977/Jun)
Flash of Emerald, (1977/Dec)
Return to Silbersee, (1978/Aug)
Late Rapture, (1978/Dec)
Pact Without Desire, (1979/Jun)
The Devil Drives, (1979/Dec)
Where The Wolf Leads, (1980/Jul)
One Brief Sweet Hour, (1980/Dec)
Invisible Wife, (1981/Jun)
The Price of Paradise, (1982/Mar)
Handmaid to Midas, (1982/Oct)
House of Discord, (1983/Nov)
Lost Yesterday, (1985/Jul)

Omnibus collections
Feathered Shaft / Wildfire Quest / Flower on the Rock (1982)

Anthologies in collaboration
Fair Horizon / Desert Nurse / Queen's Counsel (1970) (with Rosalind Brett and Alex Stuart)
Golden Harlequin Library Vol. XVII: No Silver Spoon / Nurse Nolan / The Time and the Place (1971) (with Susan Barrie and Essie Summers)
Light in the Tower / Along The Ribbonwood Track / The Linden Leaf (1975) (with Jean S. MacLeod and Mary Moore)
Roman Summer / Flamboyant Tree / Black Niall (1977) (with Isobel Chace and Mary Wibberley)
Velvet Spur / The Habit of Love / Extraordinary Engagement (1979) (with Joyce Dingwell and Marjorie Lewty)
Other Miss Donne / Thistle and the Rose / Beyond the Foothills (1985) (with Margaret Rome and Essie Summers)
One Brief Sweet Hour / Once More With Feeling / Blue Lotus (1990) (with Natalie Sparks and Margaret Way)

References and sources 

1903 births
1994 deaths
People from Yeovil
English romantic fiction writers
English women novelists
Women romantic fiction writers
20th-century English women writers
20th-century English novelists